The 1937 VPI Gobblers football team represented Virginia Agricultural and Mechanical College and Polytechnic Institute in the 1937 college football season.  The team was led by their head coach Henry Redd and finished with a record of five wins and five losses (5–5).

Schedule

Players

Roster

Varsity letter winners
Eighteen players received varsity letters for their participation on the 1937 VPI team.

References

VPI
Virginia Tech Hokies football seasons
VPI Gobblers